The men's 500 m competition in speed skating  at the 2022 Winter Olympics was held on 12 February, at the National Speed Skating Oval ("Ice Ribbon") in Beijing. The event was won by three Asians, Gao Tingyu of China (gold medal), the 2018 bronze medalist, who set a new Olympic record, Cha Min-kyu of South Korea (silver medal), replicating his 2018 success, and Wataru Morishige of Japan (bronze medal), his first Olympic medal.

The defending champion and the Olympic record holder was Håvard Holmefjord Lorentzen. Laurent Dubreuil was the 2021 World Single Distances champion at the 500 m  distance. The silver medalist and the world record holder was Pavel Kulizhnikov, who did not qualify for the event. Dubreuil was leading the 2021–22 ISU Speed Skating World Cup at the 500 m distance with eight events completed before the Olympics, followed by Morishige and Tatsuya Shinhama. Dubreuil skated the season best time, 33.77 in Calgary on 10 December 2021.

Jordan Stolz in pair 5 became the only skater with the time below 35 seconds. His time was improved in pair 7 by Gao, who set a new Olympic record at 34:32. In pair 10, Cha Min-kyu skated just 0.07 behind the time of Gao. In pair 14, Morishige skated provisionally third time, with one pair to go. In the last pair, Dubreuil was 0.02 seconds slower than Morishigem thus leaving the medal allocation unchanged.

Qualification

A total of 30 entry quotas were available for the event, with a maximum of three athletes per NOC. The first 20 athletes qualified through their performance at the 2021–22 ISU Speed Skating World Cup, while the last ten earned quotas by having the best times among athletes not already qualified. A country could only earn the maximum three spots through the World Cup rankings.

The qualification time for the event (35.70) was released on July 1, 2021, and was unchanged from 2018. Skaters had the time period of July 1, 2021 – January 16, 2022 to achieve qualification times at valid International Skating Union (ISU) events.

Records
Prior to this competition, the existing world, Olympic and track records were as follows.

A new Olympic record was set during the competition.

Results
The race was started at 16:53.

References

Men's speed skating at the 2022 Winter Olympics